The fifth and final season of the American television drama series Breaking Bad premiered on July 15, 2012, and concluded on September 29, 2013 on AMC in the United States and Canada. The 16-episode season is split into two parts, each containing eight episodes. The first part of the season was broadcast from July 15 to September 2, 2012, and aired on Sundays at 10:00 pm ET. The second part was broadcast from August 11 to September 29, 2013, and aired on Sundays at 9:00 pm ET. It debuted in the UK and Ireland on Netflix, showing one day after the episodes aired in the U.S. and Canada. Part 1 was released on region 1 DVD and region A Blu-ray on June 4, 2013, and part 2 was released on November 26, 2013. 

After receiving three nominations for seasons two, three, and four, both halves of season five won the Primetime Emmy Award for Outstanding Drama Series in 2013 and 2014. The second half of the season also won the Golden Globe Award for Best Television Series – Drama and the Screen Actors Guild Award for Outstanding Performance by an Ensemble in a Drama Series in 2014. The entire season was met with unanimous acclaim, with some critics deeming it as the greatest television season of all time. The season received a Metacritic score of 99 out of 100, leading the show to be listed in Guinness World Records as the most acclaimed television series in history.

Cast

Main
 Bryan Cranston as Walter White
 Anna Gunn as Skyler White 
 Aaron Paul as Jesse Pinkman
 Dean Norris as Hank Schrader
 Betsy Brandt as Marie Schrader
 RJ Mitte as Walter White, Jr.
 Bob Odenkirk as Saul Goodman
 Jonathan Banks as Mike Ehrmantraut
 Laura Fraser as Lydia Rodarte-Quayle 
 Jesse Plemons as Todd Alquist

Recurring

 Steven Michael Quezada as Steven Gomez
 Michael Bowen as Jack Welker
 Kevin Rankin as Kenny
 Lavell Crawford as Huell Babineaux
 Charles Baker as Skinny Pete
 Bill Burr as Patrick Kuby
 Louis Ferreira as Declan
 Chris Freihofer as Dan Wachsberger
 Matt L. Jones as Badger Mayhew
 Emily Rios as Andrea Cantillo
 Mike Batayeh as Dennis Markowsky
 Adam Godley as Elliott Schwartz
 Jessica Hecht as Gretchen Schwartz
 Jim Beaver as Lawson
 Christopher Cousins as Ted Beneke	
 Larry Hankin as Old Joe	
 Carmen Serano as Principal Carmen Molina	
 Michael Shamus Wiles as ASAC George Merkert

Episodes

Development and production 
In July 2011, series creator Vince Gilligan indicated that he intended to conclude Breaking Bad with the fifth season. In early August 2011, negotiations began over a deal regarding the fifth and possibly final season between AMC and Sony Pictures Television, the production company of the series. AMC proposed a shortened fifth season (six to eight episodes, instead of thirteen) to cut costs, but the producers declined. Sony then approached other cable networks about possibly picking up the show if a deal could not be made. On August 14, 2011, a deal was made in which AMC renewed the series for a final 16-episode season. Filming began for the season on March 26, 2012. Then in April 2012 Bryan Cranston revealed that the final season would be split into two halves, with the first half airing in 2012 and the second in 2013. After a four-month break, filming for the second half of the season began on December 7, 2012, during which AMC sent the cast and crew cupcakes decorated with characters and props used throughout the show's run.

Vince Gilligan explained that the season was split at his request in order to have more time to write the final episodes. Thomas Schnauz revealed that the writers initially tried to conceive a 16-episode arc in advance of completing the first eight episodes, but that most of these plans were scrapped as new plot points emerged "that threw everything into a little bit of chaos."

Dean Norris had asked Gilligan to kill off Hank during the first half of the season after being cast in a comedy pilot. However, Gilligan declined his request, citing the importance of Hank in the final eight episodes.

Gilligan stated that the introduction of the M60 machine gun in the season's first episode created several problems down the line in writing. When the premiere script was developed, the machine gun was written in as a thought-provoking idea to suggest to the audience that something significant was going to happen later in the season and draw them in. However, at that time, they did not plan out how the gun would be used, and Gilligan believed that with sixteen episodes, they would be able to figure something out. As Gilligan started writing the last four to five episodes, his staff reminded him about the machine gun. Gilligan was of a mind to simply drop the machine gun but realized this would not work. He eventually had a eureka moment where Walter would need to use the machine gun to kill multiple people at once rather than a single individual, leading to the development of the character of Jack Welker and the white supremacist gang to be the target of Walter's wrath.

Reception

Critical response 
On review aggregator Rotten Tomatoes, the fifth season has an approval rating of 97% based on 99 reviews, with an average rating of 9.50/10. The site's critics consensus reads: "Breaking Bads final season cements its status as one of television's great series, propelling its narrative to an explosive conclusion with sharp direction and assured storytelling." On Metacritic, it holds a 99 out of 100 based on 22 reviews, making it the highest-rated season of any show on the site. In his review of the second half of the season, Seth Amitin of IGN stated, "Whether you call it a 'half-season' or consider these final eight episodes its own season, this final batch of Breaking Bad is one of the best runs of episodes TV has ever offered." "Ozymandias" in particular was widely praised and has since been called one of the greatest television episodes ever broadcast.

Ratings
The fifth season had six separate episodes that became the most watched episodes in the series up to date, in order: "Live Free or Die" (2.93 million), "Say My Name" (2.98), "Blood Money" (5.92), "Ozymandias" (6.37), "Granite State" (6.58), and "Felina" (10.28). 

The first half of season five was watched by an average of 2.6 million viewers per episode; the second half averaged 6.04 million viewers. As a whole, season five averaged roughly 4.32 million viewers per episode.

Accolades
For the 65th Writers Guild of America Awards, the series received four nominations for Best Episodic Drama, for "Buyout" (written by Gennifer Hutchison), "Dead Freight" (George Mastras), "Fifty-One" (Sam Catlin) and "Say My Name" (Thomas Schnauz), and won for Best Dramatic Series. For the 65th Primetime Emmy Awards, the series received 13 nominations, with three wins. It won for Outstanding Drama Series, Anna Gunn won for Outstanding Supporting Actress in a Drama Series, and it won for Outstanding Single-Camera Picture Editing for a Drama Series. Nominations included Bryan Cranston for Outstanding Lead Actor in a Drama Series, Jonathan Banks and Aaron Paul for Outstanding Supporting Actor in a Drama Series, George Mastras and Thomas Schnauz for Outstanding Writing for a Drama Series ("Dead Freight" and "Say My Name"), and Michelle MacLaren for Outstanding Directing for a Drama Series ("Gliding Over All"). For the 29th TCA Awards, Breaking Bad was named Program of the Year, and also was nominated for Outstanding Achievement in Drama, and Individual Achievement in Drama for Bryan Cranston.

For the 66th Writers Guild of America Awards, the series won for Best Dramatic Series and Gennifer Hutchison won for Best Episodic Drama for "Confessions". The series received two other Best Episodic Drama nominations, Thomas Schnauz for "Buried" and Peter Gould for "Granite State". For the 20th Screen Actors Guild Awards, the cast won for Best Drama Ensemble, Bryan Cranston won for Best Drama Actor, Anna Gunn was nominated for Best Drama Actress, and the series was nominated for Best Stunt Team. For the 71st Golden Globe Awards, the series won awards for Best Drama Series and Best Drama Actor (Cranston), while Aaron Paul was nominated for Best Supporting Actor. For the 30th TCA Awards, the series won for Program of the Year and received a nomination for Outstanding Achievement in Drama, and Bryan Cranston was nominated for Individual Achievement in Drama. For the 4th Critics' Choice Television Awards, the series won for Best Drama Series and Aaron Paul won for Best Supporting Actor in a Drama Series. Bryan Cranston received a nomination for Best Actor in a Drama Series and Anna Gunn received a nomination for Best Supporting Actress in a Drama Series. For the 66th Primetime Emmy Awards, the series won Outstanding Drama Series, Bryan Cranston won Outstanding Lead Actor in a Drama Series, Aaron Paul won Outstanding Supporting Actor in a Drama Series, Anna Gunn won Outstanding Supporting Actress in a Drama, Moira Walley-Beckett won Outstanding Writing for a Drama Series for "Ozymandias", and Vince Gilligan was nominated for both Outstanding Writing for a Drama Series and Outstanding Directing for a Drama Series for "Felina".

Related media

Chicks 'N' Guns 
An eight-minute bonus scene titled Chicks 'N' Guns was included with Breaking Bads fifth season DVD and Blu-ray sets. Written by Jenn Carroll and Gordon Smith and directed by Michelle MacLaren, the scene offers a backstory on how Jesse Pinkman obtained the gun seen in the episode "Gliding Over All". Sony Pictures released a behind-the-scenes featurette discussing the scene on its YouTube channel.

Talking Bad 

After the success of the live talk show Talking Dead, which aired immediately following new episodes of The Walking Dead, AMC decided to create a similar series, titled Talking Bad, for the remaining episodes of Breaking Bad. Chris Hardwick, host of Talking Dead, also hosted this series; Talking Bad also had a similar logo and theme music to Talking Dead. Talking Bad featured crew members, actors, producers, and television enthusiasts, recapping the most recent episode, and taking questions and comments from viewers.

References

External links
 

2012 American television seasons
2013 American television seasons
5
 
Split television seasons
Television series set in 2009
Television series set in 2010